, other name Sogō Kazunari (十河 和也), fourth son of Miyoshi Motonaga, was a Japanese samurai of the Sengoku period who was a member of Miyoshi clan, daimyō of Kawachi Province.

Miyoshi Nagayoshi (eldest), Miyoshi Yukiyasu (second) and Atagi Fuyuyasu (third) are his elder brothers and Miyoshi Yoshitsugu is his son (later became Nagayoshi's adopted son). He latterly adopted Miyoshi Nagaharu (Yukiyasu's son) his child. He adopted Miyoshi Yoshikata's son, Masayasu.

His nickname was Oni Sogō as he was well known for his fighting skill and fierce like an Oni.

References

Samurai
Daimyo
Miyoshi clan
1561 deaths
Year of birth unknown
1532 births
People from Tokushima Prefecture